In mechanics, a moment is a measure of the turning effect of a force about some point in space. In most practical examples, moments are the results of forces acting at a distance from the point of interest. The stress on the body on which the force acts is then symmetric. If the moment results from a strong body force, such as that produced in a magnetic material in a strong magnetic field, the stress tensor is non-symmetric.

References
Fung, Y.C, Foundations of Solid Mechanics, Prentice-Hall (1965)

Mechanics